Ashokapuram may refer to:

 Ashokapuram, Mysore, a neighbourhood in Mysore, Karnataka state, India
 Ashokapuram railway station, a railway station in Mysore.
 Ashokapuram, Coimbatore, a neighbourhood in Coimbatore, Tamil Nadu, India